Masud Ali Khan (born 1 December 1931) is a retired Bangladeshi television, film and stage actor.

Early life
Khan first took to the stage at Manikganj.  He completed a part of his education in Kolkata and passed his Matriculation exam from Comilla Victoria College. Later, he studied at Jagannath College and Sir Salimullah College.

Career
Khan debuted his acting career in 1956 by joining the theater troupe Drama Circle. He performed for Drama Circle till the 1990s. He first acted in films through his role in "Nodi o Nari" in 1964.

Khan's television debut was through a play Bhai Bhai Shobai by Nurul Momen. It was a verse play and he played the role of the protagonist Dr. Bashir.

Works
Films
 Dipu Number Two (1996)
 Dui Duari (2000)
 Matir Moina (2002)
 Molla Barir Bou (2005)
 Priyotomeshu (2009)

Television drama serials
 Kothao Keu Nei (1990)
 Ei Shob Din Ratri (1985)

Television drama
 Badol Diner Prothom Kodom Ful
 69 (2005)
 Shukhi Manush Project (2007)
 Din Choley Jaye (2008)
 Madhur Jhamela (2008)
 Gulshan Avenue (2008)
 Madhur Jhamela (2008)
 Shada Kalo Mon (2009)
 Shapmochon (2009)
 Fifty-Fifty (2010)
 Poush Phaguner Pala (2010)
 Pavilion (2014)

Awards
 Lifetime Achievement Award by TV Drama Artiste and Playwright's Association (TENASINAS)

References

External links

Living people
1931 births
Bangladeshi male television actors
Bangladeshi male film actors
Bangladeshi male stage actors
Comilla Victoria Government College alumni
Recipients of the Ekushey Padak